This is a timeline of Italian history, comprising important legal and territorial changes and political events in Italy and its predecessor states, including Ancient Rome and Prehistoric Italy. Date of the prehistoric era are approximate. For further background, see history of Italy and list of prime ministers of Italy.



 Millennia: 1st BC1st–2nd3rd 

 Centuries: 5th BC4th BC3rd BC2nd BC1st BCSee alsoBibliography 

 Centuries: 1st2nd3rd4th5th6th7th8th9th10th11th12th13th14th15th16th17th18th19th20th21st

Paleolithic

6th millennium BC

4th millennium BC

3rd millennium BC

2nd millennium BC

8th century BC

7th century BC

6th century BC

5th century BC

4th century BC

3rd century BC

2nd century BC

1st century BC (needs editing)

1st century

2nd century

3rd century

4th century

5th century

6th century

7th century

8th century

9th century

10th century

11th century

12th century

13th century

14th century

15th century

16th century

17th century

18th century

19th century

20th century

21st century

See also
 :Category:Timelines of cities in Italy

References

Bibliography
 
 
 
 
  1900–1942. (Chronology)

External links
 
 

 
Years in Italy
Italy